Fairwood Hospital was a health facility in Upper Killay, Swansea, Wales. It was managed by the Swansea Bay University Health Board.

History
The  facility was established as a fever hospital in 1914. After joining the National Health Service in 1948 it was first a maternity hospital before changing its focus to elderly care. After being found to be uneconomic to operate, it closed in 2010. The site was subsequently acquired by Care Inn in 2019.

References

Hospital buildings completed in 1914
Defunct hospitals in Wales
Hospitals established in 1914
Organisations based in Swansea
1914 establishments in Wales
Hospitals in Swansea